Subcrop is a term in geology. It is a contrast to the term outcrop, if not a perfect antonym.

If rocks exposed at the present-day erosion surface are referred to as outcrops, then now-buried rocks that were exposed at ancient erosion surfaces are referred to as subcrops.

So, a subcrop is buried. If part of a geological formation is close to the surface, it is a subcrop. A subcrop is not outcropping, and is usually under the soil profile or alluvial sediments.

References

External links and references

 A reference
 A second reference
 A third reference

Geologic formations
Rock formations